Holy Brother Cycling Team was a Chinese UCI Continental cycling team established in 2010.

2017 Team roster

Major wins
2011
Stage 6a Tour of Singkarak, Yiming Zhao

National champions
2015
 Road Race Champion, Fengnian Wang

References

UCI Continental Teams (Asia)
Cycling teams established in 2010
Cycling teams based in China